Battle Beyond the Stars is a 1980 American space opera film produced by Roger Corman, directed by Jimmy T. Murakami, and starring Richard Thomas, Robert Vaughn, George Peppard, John Saxon, Sybil Danning and Darlanne Fluegel. Intended as a futuristic "Magnificent Seven (itself a western version of The Seven Samurai) in outer space", the screenplay was written by John Sayles with the score by James Horner and special effects designed by filmmaker James Cameron. The film was theatrically released by Corman's New World Pictures and was a moderate box office success, despite receiving mixed reviews from critics.

Plot

The farming world Akir is threatened by the tyrannical warlord Sador, who rules the sinister Malmori Empire and, his body parts deteriorating, is capturing and appropriating them from others. Sador's huge Hammerhead mounts a "Stellar Converter", a weapon that turns planets into small stars. He demands that the peaceful Akira submit to him when he returns in "seven risings". Zed, last of the famous Akira Corsairs, is old. He suggests they hire mercenaries to protect them. Since Akir lacks valuable resources, its people can offer only food and shelter in payment. Unable to go in person, Zed offers his ship. The ship is fast and well-armed, but, despite its AI navigation/tactical computer Nell, cannot defeat Sador alone. Shad, a young man who has piloted the ship and is well known to Nell, volunteers.

Seeking weapons, Shad goes to the space station of Doctor Hephaestus, an old friend of Zed. The station is populated mostly by androids, except for two humans: Hephaestus, whose numerous life support-systems have turned him into a cyborg, and his beautiful daughter Nanelia, who looks after him and the androids. The doctor wants Shad to mate with his daughter, by force if necessary. Shad cannot bring himself to abandon his people; he persuades Nanelia to help him escape. She follows in her own ship; although she has no weapons, her highly advanced computer systems might be useful. The two split up to look for more mercenaries.

Shad encounters Cowboy, a freighter-pilot from Earth who is ambushed by Space Jackers while delivering a shipment of laser-handguns to the planet Umateal. Shad fights off the Jackers, thus saving Cowboy's life twice over; they arrive at Umateal just in time to watch Sador destroy the planet with his Stellar Converter. Lacking the fuel to carry his weapons back home, Cowboy offers them to Akir instead. Shad talks Cowboy into sharing his gunslinging experience with the Akira.

Later, Shad meets a set of five alien clones who share a group consciousness named Nestor. They admit their life is incredibly dull, since their whole race shares one mind. In order to be entertained, they have sent five members to join Shad's cause. Nestor does not require payment, saying they are completely self-sufficient. Next, Shad recruits Gelt, a wealthy assassin who cannot show himself on any civilized planet for fear of retribution. Gelt offers his services in return for being allowed to live peacefully among the Akira. Gelt's ship is highly maneuverable and well-armed. On his way back to Akir, Shad is approached by Saint-Exmin of the Valkyrie warriors. She is a headstrong woman looking to prove herself in battle. She pilots a small, but extremely fast ship with enhanced firepower. Shad finds her annoying and wishes she would go away, but she tags along.

While waiting for Shad's return, Nanelia is captured by a reptilian slaver named Cayman of the Lazuli. Cayman possesses a powerful ship with an eclectic crew of aliens. She explains to Cayman that they are seeking mercenaries for a war against Sador. Cayman takes up their cause in return for the head of Sador, who destroyed Cayman's homeworld years ago. Back on Akir, Shad's sister Mol is captured by two Malmori warriors with the intent to rape her. As Shad and Company return, their approach frightens the Malmori into attempting to escape. Mol, in retaliation, interferes with their controls, allowing Gelt the opportunity to destroy their ship, killing all three. Upon reaching the planet's surface, the heroes are greeted with caution by the natives, who are wary of violent species. When Sador returns, his Malmori forces are intercepted by Shad's hired warriors. Gelt dogfights his way to Hammerhead, which shoots him down. Cowboy and the laser-toting Akira ward off an invasion backed by a Malmori Sonic Tank. Many of Sador's troops are killed, and their Sonic Tank is destroyed; however, many Akira die as well, including Zed.

After surviving an assassination attempt by Nestor, Sador launches the remainder of his fleet in a retaliatory strike against Akir. Saint-Exmin blows herself up to knock out Sador's Stellar Converter. Although Sador's aerospace forces are wiped out, Hammerhead picks off all the remaining mercenaries with laser battery-fire and nuclear missiles. Only Nell, piloted by Shad and Nanelia, survives the Malmori onslaught. Crippled and unable to fight, Nell is captured by Hammerhead's tractor beam. Nanelia and Shad activate Nell's self-destruct program, then flee their ship in an escape pod. Sador commands Nell to surrender. Instead she detonates, causing his Stellar Converter to backfire and disintegrate Hammerhead. As Shad and Nanelia return to Akir, Nanelia despairs over their friends' deaths. Shad shares with her the teachings of Akir's "Varda": nobody is truly dead when they have been loved and are celebrated by the living. The Akira will always remember the sacrifices made by the mercenaries, who will forever be honored in the legends of Akir.

Cast
 Richard Thomas as Shad, a young Akira farmer who looks for mercenaries to save his people. Over the course of the story, he evolves into the next Akira Corsair, brother of the ill-fated Mol.
 Robert Vaughn as Gelt, a notorious assassin with an intergalactic bounty on his head. Despite his vast riches, all he wants now is "a meal and a place to hide". Vaughn played Lee in The Magnificent Seven, essentially the same character as Gelt.
 John Saxon as  Sador, leader of the evil Malmori raiders, is very old and keeps himself alive using transplants to renew his body. His character is similar to the character of Calvera from The Magnificent Seven.
 George Peppard as Space Cowboy, the only character from Earth, who is defined by his many one-liners and who becomes Shad's good friend.
 Darlanne Fluegel as Nanelia, Dr. Hephaestus' beautiful daughter and Shad's love interest.
 Sybil Danning as Saint-Exmin, a Valkyrie warrior looking to prove herself in battle.
 Sam Jaffe as Dr. Hephaestus, an old man on life support, who wants grandchildren to inhabit his space station.
 Jeff Corey as Zed the Corsair, once a famed Akira warrior and now almost blind. He is the former pilot of Shad's starship, whose system computer he affectionately calls "Old Girl".
 Morgan Woodward as Cayman of the Lambda Zone, a Zymer and slaver who has a score to settle with Sador for destroying his species.
 Marta Kristen as Lux, an Akira who works the early warning system and starts a relationship with Space Cowboy.
 Earl Boen as  Nestor 1 the voice, usually, for the five clones.
 John Gowens as Nestor 2.
 Lynn Carlin as Nell's (voice), the computer which controls Zed's (now Shad's) starship. "She" is highly protective of Shad, whom she calls "wet behind the ears". The computer does not like it when anybody other than Zed addresses her as "Old Girl". 
 Larry Meyers as Kelvin 1, one of Cayman's crew, communicates by radiating body heat.
 Lara Cody as Kelvin 2.
 Steve Davis as Quepeg, another member of Cayman's crew.
 Julia Duffy as Mol, Shad's sister.

Production

Development
Battle Beyond the Stars was budgeted at an estimated $2,000,000. At the time of its release, it was the most expensive film produced by Roger Corman. Much of the budget allegedly went toward paying the salaries of George Peppard and Robert Vaughn, since both of screenwriter Sayles' previous films were low-budget productions. To save on costs, the film was produced in Corman's own studio, his "renowned lumberyard facility" in Venice, California. Initially, the film came out of producer Roger Corman's desire to make a space opera-style film in the wake of the massive worldwide success of Star Wars. Up-and-coming screenwriter John Sayles had already written the Corman-produced The Lady in Red and Piranha, the latter of which was both a financial and critical success. At one point, Australian director Richard Franklin (Patrick, Psycho II) was attached to direct. However, he was replaced by Jimmy T. Murakami, a veteran animator who had previously been an uncredited co-director on Corman's Humanoids from the Deep.

The planet Akir and its inhabitants, the Akira, a peaceful alien race at the center of the conflict, were named in honor of director Akira Kurosawa, whose film Seven Samurai provided the framework for the plot.

Corman initially hired James Cameron as a model maker for his studio after being impressed with his short film Xenogenesis. When the original art director for the film was fired, Cameron became responsible for the majority of the film's special effects, or, as Cameron later put it, "production design and art direction". This was Cameron's first "big break" in the entertainment industry, and it helped to propel his career. He was recommended by long-time working partner and future wife Gale Anne Hurd, who was at the time working for Corman.

While Cameron initially worked on camera rigging, he soon started working on special effects and production design of interior sets. The low-budget led to Cameron designing the spaceship's corridors out of spray-painted McDonald's containers. Cameron paid great attention to detail, and hardly slept for weeks while working on the film. His hard work paid off, as the special effects were one aspect of the film highly received by both fans and critics, opening the door for his later successes.

According to Hurd, actor Bill Paxton was employed on the set as a carpenter, which is where she first met him, before working with him and Cameron on Aliens: "So my first memory of Bill was him pounding nails and cracking everybody up. I mean, we’d be working at three or four in the morning and he would be the one who kept all our spirits up. He was that person on and off set".

Score
This was composer James Horner's third film score. He had previously worked on Roger Corman's Humanoids from the Deep and The Lady in Red, and the producer brought him back for Battle Beyond the Stars. The score features several elements that would become regular staples of Horner's many science fiction and adventure film scores. Several fans have noted similarities between these scores and those for later films, such as Krull and Star Trek II: The Wrath of Khan. Horner would go on to become a regular collaborator with James Cameron, eventually winning an Academy Award for Best Original Score for Titanic.

The supervising sound editor, also responsible for special sound effects, such as Robert Vaughn's "laser shot" – based on Clint Eastwood's .44 Magnum from Dirty Harry – was David Yewdall, a regular contract-worker for Corman films. Yewdall later remarked on the "film's frugal sound editorial budget" in his Practical Art of Motion Picture Sound, and explained some of the movie's sounds: each of the seven spaceships had its own sound. The Nestor ship's sound was made from human voices generated by the community choir from his hometown college in Coalinga, California; Robert Vaughn's ship was based on the recording of a dragster.

Casting
Prior to production, a Hollywood trade paper announced that John Wayne would star in the film, under the direction of Ingmar Bergman. In all likelihood, this was a joke, either by the trade paper or the film's publicist.

Reused material
The starship footage was reused in another Roger Corman science fiction film, Space Raiders, blasted by critics, as well as in the ultra-low budget Corman features Starquest II, Vampirella, The Fantastic Four, Dead Space, and Forbidden World. This same footage was also reused in later films and video games: a clip from the film (in 3-D) is shown during the movie theater fight scene at the end of Bachelor Party, and footage was also used for the LaserDisc game Astron Belt. The soundtrack was later recycled by Corman for Raptor and other films. Sections of Horner's score were reused in Space Raiders and other Corman films. The film was later picked up by Shout! Factory, who released it on DVD and Blu-ray in 2011 as part of the Roger Corman's Cult Classics series.

Release
Battle Beyond the Stars was released into 330 theatres on July 25, 1980, grossing $1.732m in its first three days. The film was released on DVD on February 6, 2001, by New Concorde. Corman recouped his costs upon selling the foreign distribution to Orion Pictures and Warner Bros. for $2.5 million. He also resold cable rights to HBO for $750,000.

Reception
Battle Beyond the Stars received mixed reviews from critics due to its similar space opera styling, capitalizing upon the success of Star Wars. Cameron's special effects were praised as being impressive, considering the film's low budget, and helped to open the door for his future success.

In Creature Feature, John Stanley gave the movie three and a half stars, recommending the film for its fun script, special effects and its spirit of fun.

Christopher John reviewed Battle Beyond the Stars in Ares Magazine #5:

The film has since garnered a cult following, in part due to its effects-heavy action set-pieces and creative production design. The film review aggregation website Rotten Tomatoes gives the film a score of 50%, based on reviews from twelve critics.

Awards and nominations

Awards
Saturn Awards
 Outstanding Achievement: Sybil Danning – 1981

Nominations
Saturn Awards
 Best Science Fiction Film: 1981
 Best Special Effects: Chuck Comisky – 1981
 Best Costumes: Durinda Wood – 1981
 Best Make-Up: Sue Dolph, Steve Neill, Rick Stratton – 1981

Battle Amongst the Stars Comic 
A prequel comic book, set 30 years before the BBTS film, was launched by Bluewater Productions in March 2010. Battle Amongst the Stars is a four-part miniseries that tells the story of how Zed, the old man played by Jeff Corey in BBTS, began his adventures from the planet Akir with Nell. It also has the characters of Dr. Hephaestus and Sador of the Malmori.

See also 
 List of American films of 1980

References

Bibliography

External links
 
 
 

1980 films
1980 independent films
1980s science fiction films
1980s Western (genre) science fiction films
American Western (genre) science fiction films
American independent films
American remakes of Japanese films
American science fiction adventure films
American space adventure films
American space opera films
1980s English-language films
Films produced by Roger Corman
Films scored by James Horner
Films set on fictional planets
Films set on spacecraft
Films with screenplays by John Sayles
New World Pictures films
Orion Pictures films
Seven Samurai
Space Western films
Films directed by Jimmy T. Murakami
1980s American films
1980s Japanese films